= Abraham Coster =

1575--1658; Costerus, Abrahamus

Personal details
- Born: 1575
- Died: 1620 (aged 44–45)
- Denomination: Calvinism
- Residence: Amsterdam

Abraham Coster (1575–1620) was a Dutch anti-Jewish preacher who lived at Amsterdam in the seventeenth century.

He wrote Histoire der Joden, a three-part history of the Jews from their dispersion to the author's time, first published in 1608. In this history he described the manners, customs, and fables of the exiles, with the purpose of influencing the authorities to prevent the Jews of Amsterdam from building a new synagogue.

== Publications ==
- Historie der Joden, die tsedert de verstooringe Jerusalems in alle landen verstroyt zijn (in Dutch). Rotterdam. 1608.
- De grouwelike ongehoorde blasphemien ende raserijen van Thomas Leamer, Engelsman (in Dutch). Rotterdam. 1613.
